Gabriel Campillo (born 19 December 1978) is a Spanish former professional boxer who competed from 2002 to 2015, and held the WBA light-heavyweight title from 2009 to 2010.

Professional career
Campillo made his professional debut on 2 February 2002, which ended in a four-round no contest against David Hernandez. On 20 September 2008, Campillo fought for the European super-middleweight title, but lost a twelve-round majority decision to Karo Murat. In his next fight, on 8 March 2009, Campillo won his first major regional championship by scoring a unanimous decision over then-reigning European Union super-middleweight champion Lolenga Mock.

On 20 June 2009, Campillo moved up to light-heavyweight and won the WBA title with a majority decision over Hugo Garay. Campillo defended the title on 15 August 2009 against Beibut Shumenov, scoring another majority decision. In their subsequent rematch, Campillo lost his title to Shumenov via split decision, in a result that was described as controversial by ringside observers. Further bad luck with judges' scorecards would continue for Campillo when he faced IBF light-heavyweight champion Tavoris Cloud on 18 February 2012, losing a split decision. Despite suffering two knockdowns in the first round, Campillo got up to win most of the rest of the rounds in the eyes of many ringside observers.

In his last series of fights, Campillo suffered numerous knockout losses to Sergey Kovalev, Andrzej Fonfara, Artur Beterbiev, and Marcus Browne.

Professional boxing record

References

External links

1978 births
Living people
Sportspeople from Madrid
World Boxing Association champions
Spanish male boxers
World light-heavyweight boxing champions
Super-middleweight boxers